The Nineteenth Canadian Ministry was the cabinet chaired by Prime Minister Lester B. Pearson.  It governed Canada from 22 April 1963 to 20 April 1968, including all of the 26th, and 27th Canadian Parliaments.  The government was formed by the Liberal Party of Canada.

Ministers

References

Succession

19
Ministries of Elizabeth II
1963 establishments in Canada
1968 disestablishments in Canada
Cabinets established in 1963
Cabinets disestablished in 1968